Judas Returning the Thirty Pieces of Silver is a painting by Rembrandt, now in Mulgrave Castle in Lythe, North Yorkshire. It depicts the story of Matthew 27:3: "Then Judas, which had betrayed him, when he saw that he was condemned, repented himself, and brought again the thirty pieces of silver to the chief priests and elders". 

Made in 1629 while he was working in Leiden, the painting is one of Rembrandt's earliest works. About 1630, Constantijn Huygens wrote an analysis of the figure of Judas in it, arguing that Rembrandt had surpassed the painters from antiquity, as well as the great sixteenth-century Italian artists when it came to the representation of emotions expressed by figures that act in a history painting. 

Because of the notoriety of Judas' betrayal of Jesus, this event in the gospels was rarely, if ever, portrayed before and this is the only instance of Rembrandt painting this scene. Here Judas is portrayed as a wretched and remorseful figure.  Bloodstains on Judas' head show he has torn his hair out. Huygens used the words "maddened" and "devoid of hope" of Judas, and Rembrandt illustrates this with Judas' wringing hands and pained grimace.  The high priest has dramatically turned away from Judas and the other elders seem at a loss what to do. The one reading a codex  seems to be counting up the pieces of silver (there are 30). Nobody meets the eye of anyone else: a technique used by Edward Hopper centuries later.

References

Literature
David Bomford, Art in the making - Rembrandt, Catalogue, The National Gallery (London 2006), p. 54–61.

Paintings in Yorkshire and the Humber
Paintings by Rembrandt
1629 paintings
Books in art
Rembrandt